Hegdal is a surname. Notable people with the surname include:

Eirik Hegdal (born 1973), Norwegian musician, composer, arranger, and music teacher
Sissel Knutsen Hegdal (born 1965), Norwegian politician

Norwegian-language surnames